Jones Boulevard is a section line arterial that runs north and south through the Las Vegas Valley. A  portion of the road is designated State Route 596 (SR 596).

Jones Boulevard description
Jones Boulevard begins at the intersection of West Erie Ave as the continuation of Star Hills Avenue. It continues north from there towards Blue Diamond Road (SR 160) where the road ends. Jones Boulevard resumes on the north side of Blue Diamond, continuing north across the Las Vegas Valley to Rancho Drive, where Jones Boulevard ends as the roadway turns east to continue as Alexander Road. Jones Boulevard resumes again just north of here, at another intersection of Rancho Drive and Alexander Road, and continues northward until reaching its final terminus just north of its intersection with Jalisco Avenue.

SR 596 description

History
In 1996, SR 596 was defined to extend from Tropicana Avenue (SR 593) north to Rancho Drive (SR 599).

By 2001, SR 596 was decommissioned between Sahara Avenue and Charleston Boulevard. As late as 2006, SR 596 was officially defined to exist in two sections. The southern section began at Tropicana Avenue and ran north along Jones Boulevard  to the Las Vegas city limits at Sahara Avenue. As of 2008, the discontinuous section was reincorporated into the route mileage.

The Nevada Department of Transportation (NDOT) removed the portion of SR 596 between Tropicana Avenue and Sahara Avenue from its maintenance logs by the beginning of 2019, and has begun the process of transferring ownership of this portion of the roadway to Clark County.

Major intersections

Public transport
RTC Transit Route 102 functions on this road.

See also

References

Boulevards in the United States
Streets in Las Vegas
Streets in the Las Vegas Valley